In 1997, The Heritage Foundation's president Edwin Feulner and Heritage's Asian policy expert Ken Sheffer formed a for-profit entity, Belle Haven Consultants. Feulner's wife, Linda Feulner, later took his place as a partner until 2001, when she became a paid senior adviser in the firm.

Belle Haven, the Heritage Foundation, and the Alexander Strategy Group (ASG) shared the same office,  Suite 401 of the Baskerville House office building, in Central Hong Kong. Belle Haven was a subcontractor, then was purchased by ASG partner Edward Stewart (co-owner with long-time associate Beth Allison Cave); was a client of ASG's lobbying business. (ASG closed in 2006 because of the Jack Abramoff scandal.)

By the end of 2001, Belle Haven had hired ASG for help "promoting and advocating Malaysia's positive investment climate and business opportunities" in connection with a company called PK Baru Energy. A new group called the US-Malaysia Exchange Association also hired ASG for support "enhancing the bilateral relationship between Malaysia and the US."  Megat Junid, an associate of then-prime minister Mahathir Mohammed, said in a 2004 interview that he organized Malaysia Exchange after talks with Edwin Feulner.

In 2001, House majority leader Tom DeLay and three other congressmen traveled to Malaysia with their spouses on a trip officially sponsored by Heritage. Heritage senior fellow and former U.S. Senator Malcolm Wallop, who went on the trip, told Time magazine that Belle Haven's financial involvement was more important to the trip than Heritage's.  In the following months, more congressmen made their way to Kuala Lumpur, the capital of Malaysia and senior Malaysian officials began beating a path to Washington, an interchange that climaxed with Mahathir visiting the White House in May 2002, which was his first state visit in eight years. Though in past years Heritage had been publicly critical of Mahathir, Feulner hosted a dinner reception on that visit to honor the prime minister.

According to US Senate records, Belle Haven paid ASG at least $620,000 between September 2001 and January 2006. Belle Haven also hired three other Washington lobbying firms, including the Western Strategy Group, run by Wallop, and the Harbour Group, around the same time, to support its Malaysian campaign, paying them a total of $780,000.

External links
 
 

The Heritage Foundation
Conservative organizations in the United States
Companies established in 1997